Siyana is a city and a municipal board with 26 wards, situated in Siyana Tehsil in the district of Bulandshahr in the Indian state of Uttar Pradesh.

Demographics
As of 2011 Indian Census, Siana NPP had a total population of 44,415, of which 23,221 were males and 21,194 were females. Population within the age group of 0 to 6 years was 6,463. The total number of literates in Siana was 26,014, which constituted 58.6% of the population with male literacy of 66.2% and female literacy of 50.2%. The effective literacy rate of 7+ population of Siana was 68.5%, of which male literacy rate was 77.6% and female literacy rate was 58.7%. The Scheduled Castes and Scheduled Tribes population was 7,454 and 1 respectively. Siana had 6818 households in 2011.

Location
Siana is located:
101 km from India's capital New Delhi
62 km from the Meerut
33 km from district headquarters Bulandshahr
434 km from state capital Lucknow
19 km from the holy Garhmukteshwar (Garh Ganga)

References

Cities and towns in Bulandshahr district